John Ellis Symonds Gowing (1835 – 2 October 1908) was an English-born Australian retailer and draper, who founded the eponymous men's department store Gowings, originally the company specialized in ladies gloves and silk umbrellas.

Early years and career

Gowing was born at Cranley Hall, Eye, Suffolk, England, and was the eldest son of 10 children of Ellis Symonds Gowing, a farmer, and his wife Charlotte Lancaster. At 24 years of age, Gowing emigrated to Sydney with £400, on the American ship, the Commonwealth. A year later his parents and siblings followed him to Australia.

On arrival in Sydney, Gowing worked on the harbour in a maritime warehouse. Soon after, he commenced working in retail with David Jones. He rose to be in charge of the mercery department and lived above the store, as was common in the era.

Gowing opened a drapery business on Crown Street, East Sydney in 1863. Five years later he and his younger brother, Preston Robert Gowing (1839–1900), opened the Mercery and Glove Depot in George Street, Sydney. John Gowing managed the store for £200 per annum and a half share of the profits. The business prospered and in 1864 a mercery warehouse, Edinburgh House, was opened. In 1878 his brother left employment as manager of another outfitters and joined Gowings. In time, ladies' gloves and silk umbrellas became less important and Gowings became known as a high-class, gentleman's outfitter. Preston Gowing predeceased his brother and in 1907 John Gowing transferred the business to his nephew and elder sons. John Gowing's son, Preston Lanchester Gowing, became chairman and ushered in a new era for the department store.

Death
In 1908, Gowing died at his home, Lyndhurst, Middleton Street, Stanmore. He was survived by his wife, Elizabeth, who had been a milliner in her native Cambridgeshire, and eight children. His funeral service was held at All Saints' Anglican Church, Petersham before masonic burial at Rookwood. Gowing was a prominent mason and a founder of the Royal Arch Masonic Lodge, Petersham.

References

1835 births
1908 deaths
Australian businesspeople in retailing
English emigrants to Australia
People from Eye, Suffolk
Burials at Rookwood Cemetery
Australian Freemasons
19th-century Australian businesspeople